Presidential elections were held in Finland on 28 January 2018. The incumbent Sauli Niinistö received 62.7% of the vote and was elected for a second term, avoiding a second round. The term is from 1 March 2018 to 1 February 2024
(if 2024 presidential election doesn't go to a second ballot) or 1 March 2024. Although the President is elected by direct election, Niinistö gained a plurality in all municipalities and a majority in all but 13 municipalities.

Candidates

Confirmed candidates

National Coalition Party

The incumbent President Sauli Niinistö was elected as the candidate of the National Coalition Party in the 2012 election. He was eligible for re-election and his decision for running again was closely followed throughout the latter half of his first term. On 29 May 2017, Niinistö announced that he would seek support for his candidacy as an independent candidate outside party politics. To become an official candidate, Niinistö needed 20,000 signatures from his supporters. Niinistö eventually gathered 156,000 signatures and his candidacy was confirmed on 25 September.

Soon after Niinistö's announcement, the leader of the National Coalition Party Petteri Orpo tweeted that Niinistö has the party's full support.

Centre Party

The Centre Party decided on 30 November 2015 that the party would choose their presidential candidate already in June 2016. Soon after, former Prime Minister and Centre Party's presidential candidate in 2006 election, Matti Vanhanen, announced that he would run for candidacy. Prime Minister Juha Sipilä declined his interest early on. Other prominent names in speculations for the candidacy were the former Prime Ministers Esko Aho and Anneli Jäätteenmäki, and former Minister of Economic Affairs Olli Rehn. Rehn declined the possibility stating that it wouldn't be possible to combine his duties as cabinet minister with campaigning. Aho did not comment his interest in candidacy, but it was considered unlikely for him to seek presidential nomination, as he was a candidate for the supervisory board of Sberbank at the time. Jäätteenmäki, an incumbent Vice President of the European Parliament, said running for president was "not on her agenda".

As no challengers appeared till the deadline of 11 May, Vanhanen was the sole candidate in June's party congress and was confirmed as the Centre Party's candidate in the presidential election. Vanhanen has said that his candidacy is motivated by the support he felt he had around the country during his last campaign and the will to improve the security situation in the areas surrounding Finland.

Finns Party

The Finns Party is likely to confirm their candidate in summer 2017. The leader of the Finns Party Timo Soini announced early on in November 2014 that he would not seek candidacy in the 2018 presidential election, after getting 3,43 % and 9,4 % of votes in 2006 and 2012 presidential elections respectively. He reaffirmed his decision in April 2016, encouraging party to move on and inviting new faces to enter party's primaries. As Soini had been a strong face for the Finns Party, his decision sparked much speculation on the party's decision, as party's presidential candidate was expected to also follow Soini as the chairman.

In March 2017, Soini announced that he would not seek another term as the leader of the party. Soon after, the chairman of the parliamentary group Sampo Terho announced that he would seek chairmanship and, if elected, also presidential candidacy. Member of the European Parliament Jussi Halla-aho, Minister of Defence Jussi Niinistö and Speaker of the Parliament Maria Lohela did also express their interest in candidacy, while Minister of Justice and Labor Jari Lindström declined early on. However, only Halla-aho decided to also seek chairmanship in the leadership election.

Choosing the presidential candidate for the party was on the agenda for party congress in June 2017. However, after Jussi Halla-aho won the leadership election, the decision was postponed by Halla-aho's request. A few days after the leadership election, twenty Finns Party MPs, including all cabinet ministers, defected to form a new parliamentary group under the name New Alternative. After the split, most of the potential presidential candidates had left the party. However, the newly elected vice-chairman Laura Huhtasaari and MP Tom Packalén announced that they were thinking about the candidacy.

On 4 August 2017, Halla-aho announced that the board of the Finns Party had chosen Huhtasaari as the presidential candidate of the party, and her candidacy was confirmed by the party council on 23 September.

Blue Reform
On 19 June 2017, Sampo Terho announced that a new party would be formed based on the New Alternative parliamentary group under the name Blue Reform. The vice-chair of the Blue Reform parliamentary group Tiina Elovaara stated initially that the group was likely to have their own presidential candidate. However, as the party was formed after the previous parliamentary election and thus has no elected MPs, it would have required to gather a sufficient number of signatures to set an own candidate. Thus, ultimately, the party decided not to put forth their own candidate and neither did it formally back any running candidate.

Green League

The party 2012 presidential candidate, Pekka Haavisto, announced in February 2017 that he will reprise his candidacy. The decision came after Haavisto had been approached multiple times by the Green Party. Previously the party leader Ville Niinistö, President Niinistö's nephew, had stated that he would not seek the candidacy. Haavisto was confirmed as the party's candidate on 12 February.

Left Alliance
The Left Alliance chose MEP Merja Kyllönen as the party's candidate on 18 March 2017, after being the only one interested in running. Former leader of the party Paavo Arhinmäki was also interested in running early on, but later decided to concentrate on running for the office of Mayor of Helsinki.

Social Democratic Party
Social Democratic Party organised an informal membership poll in August 2017 for electing the party's presidential candidate, with three candidates entering the race, MPs Maarit Feldt-Ranta, Tuula Haatainen and Sirpa Paatero. The final decision based on the membership poll was made on 2 September 2017, when it was revealed that Haatainen had received the most votes in the poll. Haatainen ultimately gained 48.6% of the votes against Feldt-Ranta's 42.3% and Paatero's 8.6%.

Before Feldt-Ranta, Haatainen and Paatero entered the party primary, Social Democratic Party was struggling to find potential candidates, as most of the prominent politicians had declined the candidacy. From early on, there was speculation on two possible candidates, Eero Heinäluoma and Jutta Urpilainen. In June 2016, Heinäluoma announced that he would not seek presidency due to his wife's recent death and ongoing work in the Parliament. In February 2017, Urpilainen also announced she would not seek presidency. The leader of the party Antti Rinne, the Governor of the Bank of Finland Erkki Liikanen and MEP Liisa Jaakonsaari likewise announced that they were not entering the presidential race. There were also talks within SDP on supporting a candidate outside the party, such as archbishop Kari Mäkinen, if no candidate would be found from within. Prominent SDP figureheads, such as Erkki Tuomioja and Lasse Lehtinen, even suggested the possibility of backing the incumbent president Sauli Niinistö.

Swedish People's Party
The Swedish People's Party decided to choose their candidate in the party congress in June 2017. As no one else entered the party's primary on 11 June, Member of the European Parliament Nils Torvalds was nominated as the party candidate. In Spring 2016, then leader of the party, Carl Haglund stated that he was thinking about candidacy, but renounced his leadership and left politics later that year.

Christian Democrats
On 19 August 2017, the Christian Democrats decided to back the incumbent President Sauli Niinistö. It was previously speculated that the leader of the party and former presidential candidate Sari Essayah would run again. However, after Essayah announced that she would not seek the candidacy, the party convention decided to back Niinistö.

Väyrynen's candidacy
Former Center Party politician and three-time presidential candidate Paavo Väyrynen announced that he would run as an independent candidate if he managed to gather the 20,000 signatures required from his supporters in time. By 26 November, he had gathered around 15,000 signatures. On 5 December, he announced that he had gathered the needed 20,000 signatures.

Campaign

Funding
The parties budgeted about as much for their campaigns than during the last presidential election in 2012. Ahead of the election, the campaign teams budgeted as follows: Niinistö 1,000,000–1,500,000 euros, Haatainen 550,000 euros, Haavisto and Vanhanen 500,000 euros, Torvalds 400,000 euros, Kyllönen 250,000 euros and Huhtasaari 200,000 euros. Väyrynen didn't leave the notion ahead of the election, but revealed afterwards that his team had collected 162,000 euros for the campaign.

After the election, Niinistö announced that the 300,000 euros that were reserved for the second round would be donated to the charity.

Debates
The first presidential debate was organised on 30 October 2017 by the Finnish Business and Policy Forum at Finlandia Hall. All confirmed candidates took part, excluding Kyllönen, who was on a business trip. The event marks the earliest moment that the incumbent president has taken part in debates. The debates continued at the University of Helsinki on 13 November, with Vanhanen being absent after being hospitalised for heart arrhythmia. As Väyrynen became an official candidate only in early December, he was not invited to the first three debates and thus the first debate, that gathered all candidates together, was organised on 13 December 2017.

Fears of Russian involvement
In October 2017, the Security Committee of the Finnish Ministry of Defence released an assessment on the possibilities of Russian involvement in the presidential election. The assessment addressed nine possible scenarios, ranging from spreading false information through social media to a political assassination. The Security Committee also suggested ten possible objectives for Russian involvement, including obstructing discussion on NATO and isolating Finland from the European Union.

Long-time Minister for Foreign Affairs Erkki Tuomioja heavily criticised the assessment and called it "pure fantasy resembling something from the pen of Ilkka Remes".

Opinion polls

Verified candidates

Hypothetical polling

Results

References

External links
Ministry of Justice – Elections website

2018
2018 elections in Finland
January 2018 events in Europe